The cherry-faced meadowhawk (Sympetrum internum) is a dragonfly of the genus Sympetrum. It is found across northern and central United States and most of Canada, including southern portions of the Yukon and Northwest Territories. Its abdomen is brown, turning dark red at maturity in both sexes. The sides of the abdomen are marked with black triangles and the legs are black. Some females have amber in basal areas of their wings. As their name suggests, faces are dark red when mature. Size: . This species overlaps with and is difficult to distinguish from the ruby, saffron-winged, and white-faced meadowhawks.

Similar species
Sympetrum costiferum – saffron-winged meadowhawk
Sympetrum obtrusum – white-faced meadowhawk
Sympetrum rubicundulum – ruby meadowhawk

References

External links 

 Cherry-faced Meadowhawk, Electronic Atlas of the Wildlife of British Columbia
 Cherry-faced Meadowhawk - Sympetrum internum, Iowa Odonata Survey
 Cherry-faced Meadowhawk Dragonfly - Sympetrum internum, North American Insects and Spiders

Libellulidae
Insects described in 1943